No Sin on the Alpine Pastures (German: Auf der Alm, da gibt's ka Sünd) is a 1950 Austrian comedy film directed by Franz Antel and starring Maria Andergast, Inge Egger and Rudolf Carl.

The film's sets were designed by the art director Gustav Abel.

Cast
 Maria Andergast as Kitty Schröder, Fürsorgeschwester 
 Inge Egger as Inge Thaller, Hotelsekretärin 
 Rudolf Carl as August Pfundhammer, Gastwirt 
 Susi Nicoletti as Annerl, seine Tochter 
 Karl Skraup as Ignaz Nagler, Bürgermeister 
 Annie Rosar as Maria, seine Frau 
 Alexander Trojan as Hans, deren Sohn 
 Joseph Egger as Der Großvater 
 Hans Richter as Paul Wittke, Fotoreporter 
 Ludwig Schmidseder as Max Obermayer, Wortberichterstatter 
 Peter Hey as Dr.Traugott Selig 
 Ida Krottendorf as Zenzi, Magd 
 Isulinde Reuser as Eva

References

Bibliography 
 Fritsche, Maria. Homemade Men in Postwar Austrian Cinema: Nationhood, Genre and Masculinity. Berghahn Books, 2013.

External links 
 

1950 films
1950 comedy films
Austrian comedy films
1950s German-language films
Films directed by Franz Antel
Films set in the Alps
Sascha-Film films
Austrian black-and-white films